Criglersville is an unincorporated community along the Old Blue Ridge Turnpike (State Route 670) in Madison County, Virginia, United States. The Robinson River passes through the town.

References

Unincorporated communities in Virginia
Unincorporated communities in Madison County, Virginia